Polypoetes nubilosa is a moth of the family Notodontidae. It is endemic to mid-elevations along the western slope of the Ecuadorian Andes.

The larvae feed on Ochroma pyramidale.

References

Moths described in 1900
Notodontidae of South America